The 2019 Conference USA men's soccer tournament, was the 25th edition of the tournament. It determined Conference USA's automatic berth into the 2019 NCAA Division I men's soccer tournament. The tournament began November 13 and concluded on November 17. The tournament was hosted by Old Dominion University, and all matches were played at the ODU Soccer Complex in Norfolk, Virginia.

Top-seed, Marshall, won their first Conference USA championship, defeating Charlotte in the final.

Seeds 
The top six teams in C-USA by conference records qualified for the tournament.

Bracket

Results

First round

Semifinals

Final

Awards

All Tournament XI

References

External links 
 C-USA Men's Soccer Tournament

Conference USA Men's Soccer Tournament
Conference USA
Conference USA